Argentinia is a genus of flies in the family Dolichopodidae.

Species
Argentinia annulitarsis Parent, 1931 – Argentina
Argentinia bickeli Naglis, 2002 – Chile
Argentinia unicolor (Parent, 1939) – Argentina

References

Dolichopodidae genera
Neurigoninae
Diptera of South America
Taxa named by Octave Parent